The Tamitatoala River is a river in Brazil.

See also
 List of rivers of Mato Grosso

References

Rivers of Mato Grosso